Nine ships of the Royal Navy have borne the name HMS Apollo, after the Greek god Apollo:

 was 20-gun storeship captured from the French in 1747 and wrecked in 1749 off Madras.
She was renamed in 1774, and was broken up in 1786.
 was a 38-gun fifth-rate launched in 1794 and wrecked in 1799 off Holland.
 was a 36-gun fifth-rate launched in 1799 and wrecked in 1804 off Portugal.
 was a 38-gun fifth-rate launched in 1805. She was put in harbour service, followed by use as a troopship in 1846 and was broken up in 1856.
 was an  protected cruiser launched in 1891. She was converted into a minelayer in 1909 and was broken up in 1920.
HMS Apollo was a  light cruiser launched in 1934. She was transferred to the Royal Australian Navy in 1938, and renamed .
 was an  launched in 1943 and broken up in 1962.
 was a  launched in 1970. She was sold to the Pakistan Navy in 1988 and renamed Zulfiquar.

Battle honours
Ships named Apollo have earned the following battle honours:
 St Vincent 1780
 China 1842
 Crimea 1854
 Normandy 1944

See also
 Apollo (disambiguation)

Royal Navy ship names